Haworthiopsis tessellata, formerly Haworthia tessellata, is a species of the genus Haworthiopsis belonging to the family Asphodelaceae. It has been considered a subspecies of its close relative, Haworthiopsis venosa.

Etymology
The genus name Haworthiopsis means "like Haworthia", which honors the British botanist Adrian Hardy Haworth (1767–1833), while the species Latin epithet tessellata means "square-patterned".

Description
Haworthiopsis tessellata is a succulent evergreen slow-growing species reaching a size of 15 cm in height. It is a stemless plant, with square patterned leaves on the upper surfaces and small teeth along the margins. The leaves are greenish, form a rosette and turn to reddish in full sun. The flowers are white and small, in an inflorescence.

It is extremely closely related to Haworthiopsis granulata (restricted to the far south-west of its range near Laingsburg) and to Haworthiopsis venosa (a species restricted to a spot on the south coast of South Africa).

Distribution and habitat
This widespread species can be found in the arid hinterland of South Africa. Its habitat is the dry, summer-rainfall Karoo, where it grows within bushes and in rocky areas. It occurs as far north as southern Namibia.

References

Bibliography
 Gibbs Russell, G. E., W. G. Welman, E. Reitief, K. L. Immelman, G. Germishuizen, B. J. Pienaar, M. v. Wyk & A. Nicholas. 1987. List of species of southern African plants. Mem. Bot. Surv. S. Africa 2(1–2): 1–152(pt. 1), 1–270(pt. 2).
 Natl. Cact. Succ. J. 32: 18 (1977).

External links
 Haworthia-gasteria
 Myfolia

tessellata
Garden plants